Ahmet Hüsamettin Cindoruk (born 8 June 1933) is a Turkish politician and the 17th Speaker of the Parliament of Turkiye between 1991 and 1995. He was also the acting president of Turkiye in 1993 and the leader of two political parties, notably of the True Path Party.

Early life and education 
He was born in 1933 in İzmir to Turkish Cretan parents. He did all his studies in Ankara, graduated from the prestigious TED Ankara College and attended the University of Ankara, earning a degree in 1955 from the Law School. Following his graduation, he started exercising the lawyer's profession.

Professional career 

He rose to national attention at a relatively young age when, after the 1960 Turkish coup d'état, he became part of the defence team for the imprisoned, and later executed ex-Prime Minister Adnan Menderes and other Democratic Party notables. Despite the final verdict in the case, the one-year-long desperate efforts by the defence team gained widespread respect across Turkey.

Political career 
After the restoration of the civilian rule, he joined the Justice Party and two military coups later, after the 1980 military coup in Turkey, he became in 1985 the Secretary General of the True Path Party, a continuation of the Justice Party in the forced absence from politics of its leader Süleyman Demirel.

He handed over the party leadership to Demirel after his return to politics and with the Democratic Party's election victory in 1991, became the 17th Speaker of the Parliament between 1991 and 1995. As such he had a strong impact when the Parliament voted to lift the immunity of the several pro-Kurdish parliamentarians of the People's Labor Party (HEP). He defended the MPs freedom of speech and was offended by the wording of the prosecutor who argued militants of the out-lawed Kurdistan Workers' Party had taken refuge in the parliaments building. Cindoruk therefor refused to send the petition to lift the immunity to the parliaments Justice and Constitutional Commission and only his deputy   sent it on in May 1992. In 1994, the immunity of seven MPs instead of the twenty-two the prosecutor demanded, were lifted. After Süleyman Demirel's election to the Presidency of the Republic vacated by Turgut Özal's death in 1993, he could have become the Prime Minister if he had not opted for a time to remain in his seat, thus opening the way for Tansu Çiller. When he eventually pushed his candidacy forward, Tansu Çiller had gained sufficient momentum within the party. He resigned from the Speaker's position in early 1995 and launched his own political movement around Party for a Democratic Turkey (DTP) But the party did not register successful results in the general elections of 1996. Nevertheless, Cindoruk and his party took part in the government formed by Mesut Yılmaz during that electoral term and after bad results also in the elections of 1999, he quit the chairmanship of the party and left active politics. After years at 2009 he became the leader of Democrat Party and after several months he united Democratic Party and Motherland Party.

Personal life 
Hüsamettin Cindoruk is married and has three children.

Footnotes

References
 Biyografi.net - Biography of Hüsamettin Cindoruk 

1933 births
Living people
20th-century presidents of Turkey
Acting presidents of Turkey
People from İzmir
Cretan Turks
TED Ankara College Foundation Schools alumni
Ankara University Faculty of Law alumni
Speakers of the Parliament of Turkey
Democrat Party (Turkey, current) politicians
Deputies of Samsun
Deputies of Eskişehir
Leaders of political parties in Turkey